The Helsinki Committees for Human Rights exist in many European countries (the OSCE region) as volunteer, non-profit organizations devoted to human rights and presumably named after the Helsinki Accords. Formerly organized into the International Helsinki Federation for Human Rights (IHF) based in Vienna.

The Helsinki Committees began as Helsinki Watch groups. The first one was founded in the Soviet Union in 1976, the second in 1977 in Czechoslovakia, the third in 1979 in Poland.
In 1982, representatives of several of these committees held an International Citizens Helsinki Watch Conference and founded the IHF.

In 1992, a British Helsinki Human Rights Group was established in the UK, but this group was always completely independent of the International Helsinki Federation for Human Rights. The UK's official representative in the IHF is the British Helsinki Subcommittee of the Parliamentary Human Rights Group, established in 1976.

Country organizations
 Albania: Albanian Helsinki Committee
 Belarus: Belarus Helsinki Committee
 Bulgaria: Bulgarian Helsinki Committee
 Croatia: Croatian Helsinki Committee
 Czech Republic: Czech Helsinki Committee
 Denmark: Danish Helsinki Committee
 Hungary: Hungarian Helsinki Committee
 Lithuania: Lithuanian Helsinki Group
 Norway: Norwegian Helsinki Committee
 North Macedonia:
 The Netherlands: Netherlands Helsinki Committee
 
 Romania:
 Russia: Moscow Helsinki Group
 Serbia: Helsinki Committee for Human Rights in Serbia
 Slovakia: Helsinki Committee for Human Rights in Slovakia
 Spain: Helsinki España - Human Dimension
 Sweden: Civil Rights Defenders (formerly the Swedish Helsinki Committee)
 Switzerland: Swiss Helsinki Committee for democracy, Rule of law and Human Rights
 Turkey: Helsinki Citizens' Assembly
 Turkmenistan: Turkmen Helsinki Foundation for Human Rights
 Ukraine: Ukrainian Helsinki Group

See also
 Human Rights Watch

External links
 Helsinki Committee for Human Rights in Serbia
 Bulgarian Helsinki Committee 
 Czech Helsinki Committee
 Helsinki Committee for Human Rights of the Republic of Macedonia
 International Helsinki Federation for Human Rights - close down notice
 "Human rights movement active despite fraud scandal, former director says"

References

Human rights organizations